Dutton Aerodrome  is located in Dutton, Ontario, Canada.

References

Registered aerodromes in Ontario